Warhammer Monthly was a comics anthology published by Games Workshop's publishing arm, Black Library, from March 1998 to December 2004, running to 86 issues in total. The final two issues were published bi-monthly under the name Warhammer Comic. It featured stories set within the fictional universe of Games Workshop's miniature wargames Warhammer and Warhammer 40,000, amongst others.

Format
The comic used an anthology format, usually featuring three or four stories each of seven to eight pages in length. The stories in Warhammer Monthly were usually serialised, and would run for several months. The most popular stories returned for more series, and were often collected in trade paperback form.

The December 2002 issue of the comic book was called Warhammer Warped Visions. It featured one-shot variations of Black Library's most popular comics, but with their settings reversed between the Warhammer and Warhammer 40,000 universes. For example, the Dark Elf Malus Darkblade was portrayed as a female Dark Eldar named Maless, while the Titan Imperius Dictatio was shown as an Empire Steam Tank.

Cancellation
Warhammer Monthly was cancelled after issue 86 as sales were poor in comparison to the numerous novels Black Library were producing. 

In 2006, Games Workshop licensed the comic books rights to Boom! Studios. That publisher's first Warhammer 40,000 release was Damnation Crusade, written by Warhammer Monthly stalwart Dan Abnett.

In 2007, The Black Library started the Warhammer Monthly Archive, a site with free PDF versions of the comics.  However the site was closed in 2009.

Awards
Warhammer Monthly was voted the Best New British comic in the 1999 National Comics Awards.

The series was nominated for two Eagle Awards and won one:
 2000 - nominated for Favourite British Comic
 2001 - nominated for Favourite British Comic
 2005 - won Favourite British Comic

See also
 Warhammer 40,000 comics, about the various releases

Notes

References

External links
 Cached version of Black Library's Warhammer Monthly mini-site
 WHM downloads, PDFs of the full issues #0-13, Black Library
 Warhammer Comic #86, details of the last issue

1998 comics debuts
Comics anthologies
Games Workshop